The entropy unit is a non-S.I. unit of thermodynamic entropy, usually denoted "e.u." and equal to one calorie per kelvin per mole, or 4.184 joules per kelvin per mole.  Entropy units are primarily used in chemistry to describe enthalpy changes.

Sources

Units of measurement